Marlon James may refer to:

 Marlon James (novelist) (born 1970), Jamaican writer, winner of the 2015 Man Booker Prize
 Marlon James (footballer) (born 1976), Vincentian retired footballer